Jajahuaycho or Ccaccahuaycho (possibly from Aymara for a swift)  is a mountain in the Apolobamba mountain range in Peru and the name of a lake near the mountain. The mountain and the lake are located in the Puno Region, Putina Province, Ananea District. It lies northwest of the mountains Palomani and Chocñacota and west of the lake Chocñacota. Parihuani ("the one with flamingos") and Huanacuni ("the one with guanacos") are the names of the northwestern and northeastern peaks of Jajahuaycho.

The lake named Jajahuaycho stretches along the northern slopes of the mountain.

References 

Mountains of Puno Region
Lakes of Puno Region
Mountains of Peru
Lakes of Peru